Aykut Kayacık (born 1962) is a Turkish-German actor.

Partial filmography

 (1991) - Alpinist
 (1992) - Türsteher
Dunkle Schatten der Angst (1993)
Toms Zimmer (1995) - Barbesitzer
Aufstand der Sandkörner (1996, Short)
Dunckel (1998, TV Movie) - Polizist #1
Lola and Billy the Kid (1999) - Bili's Friend
Otto – Der Katastrophenfilm (2000)
Trust Me (2000) - Erol
England! (2000)
Female 2 Seeks Happy End (2001)
Viktor Vogel – Commercial Man (2001) - Zauberer
Endstation Tanke (2001) - Dixi-Klo-Fahrer
What to Do in Case of Fire? (2001) - Bülent
Inspektor Rolle (2002-2004, TV series) - Orkan Örsey
Soloalbum (2003)
 (2004) - Broccoli Ahmet
Neuschwanstein Conspiracy (2005, Short)
Grosse Lügen (2007)
Blindflug (2007) - Schrotthändler
Viviere (2007) - Enrico Conchiglia
Janjan (2007) - Ahmet
Made in Europe (2007)
Fast Track: No Limits (2008) - Sal
 (2009) - Boskin
Gurbet – Fremde Heimat (2010) - Peter Klotzbach
Takiye: Allah yolunda (2010) - Leiter Jimpa-Büro
Vater Morgana (2010) - Fazeli
Almanya: Welcome to Germany (2011) - Veli
Zenne Dancer (2011) - Zindan
 (2012) - Taxifahrer
 (2012) - Freund Metzgerin (uncredited)
Glanz & Gloria (2012) - Captain Warnecke
Heiter bis wolkig (2012) - Taxifahrer
 (2013) - Emre
Das kleine Gespenst (2013) - Burgverwalter
Willkommen bei Habib (2013) - Feridun
 (2013) - Chefkoch
The Physician (2013) - Shah Official
Das schaffen wir schon (2017) - Erdogan

References

External links

Official Website

1962 births
German people of Turkish descent
Living people
German male film actors
German male television actors
Turkish male film actors
Turkish male television actors
Best Actor Golden Boll Award winners